Elections were held in the Ilocos Region for seats in the House of Representatives of the Philippines on May 13, 2013.

The candidate with the most votes won that district's seat for the 16th Congress of the Philippines.

Summary

Ilocos Norte

1st District
Incumbent Rodolfo Fariñas is running unopposed.

2nd District
Imelda Marcos is the incumbent.

Ilocos Sur

1st District
Incumbent Ryan Singson is not running; instead, he is for the governorship of Ilocos Sur. His brother, former Representative Ronald Singson who had resigned in 2011 due to a personal scandal, is his party's nominee.

2nd District
Eric Singson is the incumbent.

La Union

1st District
Victor Francisco Ortega is the incumbent.

2nd District
Eufranio Eriguel is the incumbent.

Pangasinan

1st District
Jesus Celeste is the incumbent.

2nd District
Leopoldo Bataoil is the incumbent.

3rd District
Incumbent Maria Rachel Arenas was running unopposed but backed out; her mother, Rose Marie Arenas is her substitute.

4th District
Gina de Venecia is the incumbent.

5th District
Carmen Cojuangco is the incumbent.

6th District
Incumbent Marilyn Primcias-Agabas is running unopposed after her sole opponent, Brigido Gallano (independent), withdrew.

References

2013 Philippine general election
Lower house elections in the Ilocos Region